Svensk Botanisk Tidskrift is a peer-reviewed scientific journal on botany published by the Svenska Botaniska Föreningen since 1907. It is published five times a year. It is abstracted and indexed in BIOSIS Previews and Scopus.

References

External links 
  (in Swedish) (link accessed 21 February 2020)
 Online archive (1907-1911)
 

Botany journals
Swedish-language journals
Publications established in 1907